Trithemis pruinata is a species of dragonfly in the family Libellulidae. It is found in Cameroon, the Democratic Republic of the Congo, Ivory Coast, Gabon, Ghana, Guinea, Kenya, Nigeria, Tanzania, Togo, Uganda, and Zambia. Its natural habitats are subtropical or tropical moist lowland forests and rivers.

References

pruinata
Taxonomy articles created by Polbot
Insects described in 1899